"Come Around" is the title of a R&B single by Chantay Savage. It was the lead single from her album This Time and the single was released on June 11, 1999. The week the single was released it was the top debuting single on the Billboard R&B chart.

Chart positions

References

1999 singles
1999 songs
RCA Records singles
Chantay Savage songs
Songs written by Jerry Flowers
Songs written by Keith Sweat
Songs written by Athena Cage